Kearney County is a county located in the U.S. state of Nebraska. As of the 2010 United States Census, the population was 6,489. Its county seat is Minden. The county was formed in 1860. It was named for Fort Kearny, which in turn was named for Brigade General Stephen W. Kearny.

Kearney County is part of the Kearney Micropolitan Statistical Area.

In the Nebraska license plate system, Kearney County is represented by the prefix 52 (it had the 52nd-largest number of vehicles registered in the county when the license plate system was established in 1922).

Geography
The terrain of Kearney County consists of gently rolling low hills, mostly devoted to agriculture. The Platte River flows eastward along the north county boundary.

Major highways

  U.S. Highway 6
  U.S. Highway 34
  Nebraska Highway 10
  Nebraska Highway 44
  Nebraska Highway 74

Adjacent counties

 Buffalo County - north
 Adams County - east
 Webster County - southeast
 Franklin County - south
 Harlan County - southwest
 Phelps County - west

Protected areas

 Clark Federal Waterfowl Production Area
 Fort Kearny State Historical Park
 Fort Kearny State Recreation Area (partial)
 Jensen Lagoon National Wildlife Management Area
 Prairie Dog Federal Waterfowl Production Area
 Youngson Lagoon Natural Wildlife Production Area

Demographics

As of the 2000 United States Census there were 6,882 people, 2,643 households, and 1,902 families in the county. The population density was 13 people per square mile (5/km2). There were 2,846 housing units at an average density of 6 per square mile (2/km2). The racial makeup of the county was 97.82% White, 0.16% Black or African American, 0.20% Native American, 0.23% Asian, 0.01% Pacific Islander, 0.99% from other races, and 0.58% from two or more races. 2.34% of the population were Hispanic or Latino of any race.

There were 2,643 households, out of which 34.40% had children under the age of 18 living with them, 62.90% were married couples living together, 6.40% had a female householder with no husband present, and 28.00% were non-families. 24.30% of all households were made up of individuals, and 10.90% had someone living alone who was 65 years of age or older. The average household size was 2.50 and the average family size was 2.98.

The county population contained 80% under the age of 18, 6.40% from 18 to 24, 27.50% from 25 to 44, 22.70% from 45 to 64, and 16.70% who were 65 years of age or older. The median age was 39 years. For every 100 females, there were 98.40 males. For every 100 females age 18 and over, there were 94.60 males.

The median income for a household in the county was $39,247, and the median income for a family was $44,877. Males had a median income of $29,987 versus $20,081 for females. The per capita income for the county was $18,118. About 5.50% of families and 8.50% of the population were below the poverty line, including 10.00% of those under age 18 and 6.80% of those age 65 or over.

Communities

City
 Minden (county seat)

Villages

 Axtell
 Heartwell
 Norman
 Wilcox

Unincorporated communities
 Keene
 Lowell
 Newark

Ghost town
 Dobytown

Townships

 Blaine
 Cosmo
 Eaton
 Grant
 Hayes
 Liberty
 Lincoln
 Logan
 Lowell
 May
 Mirage
 Newark
 Oneida
 Sherman

Notable people
 Carl Curtis, Republican in the U.S. House of Representatives and U.S. Senate

Politics
Kearney County voters are strongly Republican. In only one national election since 1936 has the county selected the Democratic Party candidate.

See also
 National Register of Historic Places listings in Kearney County, Nebraska

References

External links
 

 
Kearney Micropolitan Statistical Area
1860 establishments in Nebraska Territory
Populated places established in 1860